Grigorijs Ņemcovs (Grigory Nemtsov; 11 December 1948 in Babruysk, Soviet Union (today Belarus) – 16 April 2010 in Daugavpils, Latvia) was a Latvian journalist, businessman and politician (deputy mayor of Daugavpils). He began his career in Daugavpils city council. He published a regional newspaper (Million) and owned a local television station.

Ņemcovs founded Latvia's largest regional Russian-language newspaper, Million, in 1995. The paper has covered  political and local government corruption and mismanagement.

He was the founder of the society movement Latgales Tauta (Nation of Latgale). In 2007, death threats were made against Ņemcovs, and his house was burned down. The arsonists have not been identified. He was also physically attacked in 2000 by unidentified assailants who took his passport.

On 16 April 2010, Ņemcovs was shot twice in the head at close range when he went to a meeting in a café. The murder appeared to have been carefully planned and executed. The gunman seemed to have been following Ņemcovs when he arrived at a café on Lāčplēša iela near the University of Daugavpils. He was already dead when emergency services arrived at the scene. He was 61 years old.

References

External links
Biodata
Reporters without borders: 'Newspaper owner gunned down in apparent contract killing' 
Pilsētas centrā nošauj Daugavpils mēra vietnieku Diena
Šodien, 21. aprīlī pēdējā gaitā izvada Grigoriju Ņemcovu City of Daugavpils

1948 births
2010 deaths
Politicians from Daugavpils
Assassinated Latvian politicians
Assassinated Latvian journalists
People murdered in Latvia
Latvian murder victims
2010 crimes in Latvia
2010 murders in Europe
2010s murders in Latvia
Writers from Daugavpils